Zanca-Sant'Andrea is a village in Tuscany, central Italy, administratively a frazione of the comune of Marciana, province of Livorno. At the time of the 2011 census its population was 188.

The village is located on the Elba Island and includes the hamlets of Sant'Andrea and Zanca. It is about 6 km from Marciana.

Bibliography 
 
 

Frazioni of the Province of Livorno